Moonlight in Maubeuge, is a French comedy film from 1962, directed by Jean Chérasse, written by Claude Choublier, starring Claude Brasseur and Louis de Funès (uncredited). The film was known under the title Moonlight in Maubeuge (international English title).

Cast 
Claude Brasseur: Walter, the right hand of Tonton Charly
Pierre Perrin: Paul Prunier, the taxi compositor
Bernadette Lafont: Charlotte, the secretary
Rita Cadillac: Monique, a secretary
Michel Serrault: Charpentier, the lecturer
Jean Carmet: Fernand, the driver
André Bourvil: Lui-même, singing the song to television
Jacques Dufilho: the director of the 'Maison de la Radio'
Jean Lefebvre: a miner
Robert Manuel: Tonton Charly, the manager of Superdisco music
Maria Pacôme: the journalist
Louis de Funès (uncredited)

References

External links 
 
 La Vendetta (1961) at the Films de France

1962 films
French comedy films
1960s French-language films
French black-and-white films
Films directed by Jean Chérasse
1960s French films